A unit of length refers to any arbitrarily chosen and accepted reference standard for measurement of length. The most common units in modern use are the metric units, used in every country globally. In the United States the U.S. customary units are also in use. British Imperial units are still used for some purposes in the United Kingdom and some other countries. The metric system is sub-divided into SI and non-SI units.

Metric system

SI

The base unit in the International System of Units (SI) is the metre, defined as "the length of the path travelled by light in vacuum during a time interval of  seconds." Other SI units are derived from the metre by adding prefixes, as in millimetre or kilometre, thus producing systematic decimal multiples and submultiples of the base unit that span many orders of magnitude.

Non-SI
Other non-SI units are derived from decimal multiples of the metre.

Imperial/US

The basic unit of length in the imperial and U.S. customary systems is the yard, defined as exactly  by international treaty in 1959.

Common imperial units and U.S. customary units of length include:
 thou or mil ( of an inch)
 inch
 foot (12 inches, 0.3048 m)
 yard (3 feet, 0.9144 m)
 (terrestrial) mile (5280 feet, 1609.344 m) 
 (land) league

Marine
In addition, the following are used by sailors:
 fathom (for depth; only in non-metric countries) (2 yards = 1.8288 m)
 nautical mile (one minute of arc of latitude = )

Aviation
Aviators use feet for altitude worldwide (except in Russia and China) and nautical miles for distance.

Surveying

Surveyors in the United States continue to use:
 chain (22 yards, or )
 rod (also called pole or perch) (quarter of a chain, 5 yards, or )

Science

Astronomy

Astronomical measure uses:
Earth radius  ≈ 6,371 km
 Lunar distance LD ≈ . Average distance between the center of Earth and the center of the Moon.
astronomical unit au. Approximately the distance between the Earth and Sun.
light-year ly ≈ . The distance that light travels in a vacuum in one Julian year.
parsec pc ≈  or about 
Hubble length 14.4 billion light-years or 4.55 gigaparsecs

Physics
In atomic physics, sub-atomic physics, and cosmology, the preferred unit of length is often related to a chosen fundamental physical constant, or combination thereof. This is often a characteristic radius or wavelength of a particle. Some common natural units of length are included in this table:

Archaic

Archaic units of distance include:
cana
cubit
rope
league
li (China)
pace (the "double pace" of about 5 feet used in Ancient Rome)
verst (Russia)

Informal

In everyday conversation, and in informal literature, it is common to see lengths measured in units of objects of which everyone knows the approximate width. Common examples are:
Double-decker bus (9.5–11 metres in length)
Football field (100 yards in length)
Thickness of a human hair (around 80 micrometres)

Other
Horse racing and other equestrian activities keep alive:
 furlong ≈ 
horse length ≈

See also
List of examples of lengths

Medieval weights and measures
Orders of magnitude (length)
System of measurement
Units of measurement

References

Further reading